Jeremy Cole (born 24 April 1941) is a Zimbabwean sports shooter. He competed in the mixed skeet event at the 1980 Summer Olympics.

References

1941 births
Living people
Zimbabwean male sport shooters
Olympic shooters of Zimbabwe
Shooters at the 1980 Summer Olympics
Place of birth missing (living people)